is a Japanese footballer who plays as a defensive midfielder for  club Tokyo Verdy.

Club career
On 26 December 2016, Miyahara joined Nagoya Grampus on a season-long loan deal, extended his loan deal with Nagoya Grampus 30 December 2017 for an additional year.

On 18 December 2018, Nagoya Grampus announced the permanent signing of Miyahara from Sanfrecce Hiroshima.

After four seasons with Nagoya, in December 2022 it was announced that Miyahara would be joining J2 League club Tokyo Verdy for the 2023 season.

National team career
In October 2013, Miyahara was elected Japan U-17 national team for 2013 U-17 World Cup. He played three matches.

Club statistics
.

Honours
Nagoya Grampus
J.League Cup: 2021

References

External links

Profile at Nagoya Grampus
 Profile at Sanfrecce Hiroshima 

1996 births
Living people
Association football people from Hiroshima Prefecture
Japanese footballers
J1 League players
J2 League players
J3 League players
Sanfrecce Hiroshima players
J.League U-22 Selection players
Nagoya Grampus players
Tokyo Verdy players
Association football midfielders